Helene Clarkson is a Canadian actress. She has most notably starred in the 1995 Canadian film, Blood and Donuts, earning a Genie Award nomination.  She has also acted in several TV films, as well as in a 1995 episode of The X-Files, named "The Calusari".

Awards and nominations

References

External links
 

Canadian television actresses
Canadian film actresses
Living people
Year of birth missing (living people)